Miss Grace's Lane (also known as Miss Grace's Lane Swallett), near Tidenham in the Forest of Dean, Gloucestershire, England, is a natural cave system, the entrance to which was excavated between 1994 and 1997 by members of the Royal Forest of Dean Caving Club (RFDCC).

Entry to the cave is via a locked manhole cover, the keys to which are held by the RFDCC, which has an access agreement with the landowners, the Forestry Commission. A  shaft with a fixed ladder gives access to the first chamber known as "Autumn Frenzy".

References

External links
Detailed description of the cave
Cave survey by Royal Forest of Dean Caving Club.

Caves of Gloucestershire
Tidenham